The Bangladeshi 2-taka note (৳2) is made up of hundred 200 poisa as ৳2 = 200 poisa. Currently, it is one of government-issued Bangladeshi banknote in circulation. As a result, the two taka note is a note bearing the signature of the Finance Secretary and not the Governor of the national bank of the country.

The Government of Bangladesh issued this note for public use on 29 December 1988. The color of the note is salmon pink. Front side of the note had a monument to the Bengali language movement and on the back was a picture of a magpie bird. In 2015, it was decided to abolish the two taka note. These notes are smuggled to India and Bangladesh for the purpose of making counterfeit money, preserving them as antiques and making drugs. In 15 July 2021, the note was issued under new finance secretary. The present note has picture of Bangabandhu.

References

External link

 Taka Two : Bangladesh Bank

Banknotes of Bangladesh
Two-hundred-base-unit banknotes
Currencies introduced in 1988
Bengali language movement